Darwha Vidhan Sabha seat was one of the constituencies of Maharashtra Vidhan Sabha, in India. Darwha seat existed from 1972 until the 2004 elections. Darwha is in Yavatmal District.

Members of Legislative assembly

References

Former assembly constituencies of Maharashtra